Eresiomera is a genus of butterflies in the family Lycaenidae. It is sometimes treated as a synonym of Pseuderesia.

Species
Eresiomera bicolor (Grose-Smith & Kirby, 1890)
Eresiomera campbelli Collins & Larsen, 1998
Eresiomera clenchi (Stempffer, 1961)
Eresiomera cornesi (Stempffer, 1969)
Eresiomera cornucopiae (Holland, 1892)
Eresiomera isca (Hewitson, 1873)
Eresiomera jacksoni (Stempffer, 1969)
Eresiomera kiellandi Larsen, 1998
Eresiomera magnimacula (Rebel, 1914)
Eresiomera mapongwa (Holland, 1893)
Eresiomera nancy Collins & Larsen, 1998
Eresiomera nigeriana (Stempffer, 1962)
Eresiomera osheba (Holland, 1890)
Eresiomera ouesso (Stempffer, 1962)
Eresiomera paradoxa (Schultze, 1917)
Eresiomera petersi (Stempffer & Bennett, 1956)
Eresiomera phaeochiton (Grünberg, 1910)
Eresiomera phillipi Collins & Larsen, 1998
Eresiomera rougeoti (Stempffer, 1961)
Eresiomera rutilo (Druce, 1910)

References

 Seitz, A. Die Gross-Schmetterlinge der Erde 13: Die Afrikanischen Tagfalter. Plate XIII 62

Poritiinae
Lycaenidae genera